The finals and the qualifying heats of the Men's 1500 metres Freestyle event at the 1993 FINA Short Course World Championships were held in Palma de Mallorca, Spain.

Results

See also
1992 Men's Olympic Games 1500m Freestyle
1993 Men's European LC Championships 1500m Freestyle

References
 Results
 swimrankings

F